Our Lady of Endor Coven, also known as Ophite Cultus Sathanas, was an American Satanic cult founded by Herbert Arthur Sloane (born September 3, 1905, died June 16, 1975) in Cleveland, Ohio, with a claimed origin in 1948 though definitive documentation of the group does not appear until the 1960s.  

The group was heavily influenced by gnosticism (especially that found in the contemporary book by Hans Jonas, The Gnostic Religion), and worshipped Sathanas, their name for Satan (Cultus Sathanas is a Latin version of Cult of Satan).  Sathanas (or Satan), was defined in gnostic terms, as the Serpent in the Garden of Eden who revealed the knowledge of the true God to Eve.  That it called itself "Ophite" is a reference to the ancient gnostic sect of the Ophites, who were said to worship the serpent. 

The "Lady of Endor" is a reference to the Witch of Endor, a woman in the Hebrew Bible said to summon spirits of the deceased. Sloane's Coven was first publicly documented in the middle of 1968, when British occult writer Richard Cavendish said that he had received a letter from a Satanist "lodge" in Toledo, Ohio and a 1967 interview with Sloane with a Toledo newspaper about his occult and fortune telling business made no mention of it. While current scholars of Satanism point out that there is no substantial evidence showing Our Lady of Endor Coven existing prior to 1966, some also point out that it is likely that his group did have roots prior to that time:

It seems probable the group was in existence before 1966, although I have not found any traces of it in literature prior to that date. Sloane himself suggested that he was already operating in the 1940s, but given the many parallels with Wicca the group displayed, it is more likely its date of origin must be located sometime after 1953, the year Gerald Gardner's neopagan cult of witchcraft came into the open.

Beliefs

Sloane had a Protestant upbringing. Sloane referred in his June 1968 letter to his group as "Our Lady of Endor Coven, The Ophitic Cultus Sathanas" and clarifies that it was Sathanas in the form of the Serpent who brought the knowledge (gnosis) of the true God to Eve when she ate of the Tree of Knowledge. This true God is above the creator god of this world. He writes that Cain was the first Satanic priest and performed the first Satanic Mass (which explains Cain being punished by the creator god). According to Sloane, True Satanists then, are following the way of the Serpent and of Cain, as the early ophitic gnostics were.

This terminology is summed up in Hans Jonas' book within a few pages, titled "Eve and the Serpent", and "Cain and the Creator":

... it is the serpent that persuades Adam and Eve to taste of the fruit of knowledge and thereby to disobey their Creator ... Indeed, more than one gnostic sect derived its name from the cult of the serpent ("Ophites" from the Gk. ophis; "Naassenes" from the Heb. nahas--the group as a whole being termed "ophitic")

This general Serpent is also the wise Word of Eve. This is the mystery of Eden: this is the river that flows out of Eden. This is also the mark that was set on Cain, whose sacrifice the god of this world [the creator god] did not accept whereas he accepted the bloody sacrifice of Abel: for the lord of this world delights in blood.

Sloane believed in a horned god, which he said was revealed to him in the woods when he was a child. This horned god, according to him, was the original and most ancient god ever worshipped by humans (he explains that anthropology has proven this). After seeing Margaret Murray's book The God of the Witches (published in 1931), he said he realized that the horned god was Satan (Sathanas). Sloane had become very active in the Spiritualist Church movement, being a minister in a Spiritualist Church since the 1930s, and traveling to various locations in Ohio to perform services. He describes his coven of Sathanas as developing out of his occupation with Spiritualism.

Sloane also corresponded with his contemporary Gerald Gardner (the founder of the Wicca movement, who died in 1964), concerning Sloane's interest in portraying true witches as worshiping Satan, or "Sathanas", a view which Gardner himself fought against in his writings. However, Sloane did believe that, while "gnosis" referred to knowledge, and "wicca" referred to wisdom, modern witches had fallen away from the true knowledge, and instead had begun worshipping a fertility god, a reflection of the creator god. 

When the Church of Satan appeared in the 1960s, Sloane began corresponding with Anton LaVey, with an interest in finding more Satanists to participate in his own organization. Sloane highly recommended the book The Gnostic Religion, and selections from it were sometimes read at ceremonies.

References

Citations

Works cited

 
 

 
 James R. Lewis (2001). Satanism Today, ABC-CLIO Incorporated, ISNB 9781576072929

Further reading
  Contains 1970 interview with Sloane.
  Contains interview with Sloane.
  Quotes Sloane's mimeographed material, and describes his Coven.

Cults
Magical organizations
New religious movements
Organizations based in Cleveland
Religion in Ohio
Satanism in the United States
Witch of Endor